is a passenger railway station located in the city of Gobō, Wakayama Prefecture, Japan, operated by the private Kishū Railway

Lines

Station layout
The station consists of one side platform serving a single bi-directional track. The station is unattended.

Adjacent stations

History
It was renamed to its present name a few days later. The current station building was rebuilt in September 1979.

Passenger statistics
In fiscal 2019, the station was used by an average of 71 passengers daily (boarding passengers only).

Surrounding Area
 Hidaka General Hospital
 Gobō Cultural Hall
 Gobō City Gymnasium
 Gobō City Gobo Elementary School

See also
List of railway stations in Japan

References

External links

Railway stations in Wakayama Prefecture
Railway stations in Japan opened in 1931
Gobō, Wakayama